The 2004 Bahrain Grand Prix (officially the 2004 Gulf Air Bahrain Grand Prix) was a Formula One motor race held on 4 April 2004 at the Bahrain International Circuit. It was Race 3 of 18 in the 2004 FIA Formula One World Championship. It was the first Formula One race to be held in the Kingdom of Bahrain and the Middle East. The 57-lap race was the third round of the 2004 Formula One season. The race was won by Ferrari driver Michael Schumacher. His teammate Rubens Barrichello completed a 1-2 for the team, whilst Jenson Button completed the podium for the BAR team by finishing in third position.

Friday drivers
The bottom 6 teams in the 2003 Constructors' Championship were entitled to run a third car in free practice on Friday. These drivers drove on Friday but did not compete in qualifying or the race.

Classification

Qualifying 

Notes
  – Nick Heidfeld, Zsolt Baumgartner and Kimi Räikkönen received a 10-place grid penalty for engine changes.

Race

Notes
  – Gianmaria Bruni started the race from the pitlane.

Championship standings after the race

Drivers' Championship standings

Constructors' Championship standings

Note: Only the top five positions are included for both sets of standings.

References

External links
 News on 2004 Bahrain GP

Bahrain Grand Prix
Bahrain Grand Prix
Grand Prix
Bahrain Grand Prix